Slacklining refers to the act of walking, running or balancing along a suspended length of flat webbing that is tensioned between two anchors. Slacklining is similar to slack rope walking and tightrope walking. Slacklines differ from tightwires and tightropes in the type of material used and the amount of tension applied during use. Slacklines are tensioned significantly less than tightropes or tightwires in order to create a dynamic line which will stretch and bounce like a long and narrow trampoline. Tension can be adjusted to suit the user, and different webbing may be used in various circumstances.

Styles of slacklining

Urbanlining

Urbanlining or urban slacklining combines all the different styles of slacklining. It is practiced in urban areas, for example in city parks and on the streets. Most urban slackliners prefer wide  lines for tricklining on the streets, but some may use narrow lines for longline purposes or for waterlining. Also see the other sections of slackline styles below.

One type of urbanlining is timelining, where one tries to stay on a slackline for as long as possible without falling down. This takes tremendous concentration and focus of will, and is a great endurance training for postural muscles.

Another type of urbanlining is streetlining, which combines street workout power moves with the slackline's dynamic, shaky, bouncy feeling. The main aspects include static handstands, super splits—hands and feet together, planche, front lever, back lever, one arm handstand and other unusual extreme moves that are evolving in street workout culture.

Tricklining
Tricklining has become the most common form of slacklining because of the easy setup of  slackline kits. Tricklining is often done low to the ground but can be done on highlines as well. A great number of tricks can be done on the line, and because the sport is fairly new, there is plenty of room for new tricks. Some of the basic tricks done today are walking, walking backwards, turns, drop knee, running and jumping onto the slackline to start walking, and bounce walking. Some intermediate tricks include: Buddha sit, sitting down, lying down, cross-legged knee drop, surfing forward, surfing sideways, and jump turns, or "180s". Some of the advanced tricks are: jumps, tree plants, jumping from line-to-line, 360s, butt bounces, and chest bounces. With advancements in webbing technology and tensioning systems, the limits for what can be done on a slackline are being pushed constantly. It is not uncommon to see expert slackliners incorporating flips and twists into slackline trick combinations.

Highlining

Highlining is slacklining at elevation above the ground or water. Many slackliners consider highlining to be the pinnacle of the sport. Highlines are commonly set up in locations that have been used or are still used for Tyrolean traverse. When rigging highlines, experienced slackers take measures to ensure that solid, redundant and equalized anchors are used to secure the line into position. Modern highline rigging typically entails a mainline of webbing, backup webbing, and either climbing rope or ultra-high-molecular-weight polyethylene rope for redundancy. However, many highlines are rigged with a mainline and backup only, especially if the highline is low tension (less than ), or rigged with high quality webbing like Type 18 or MKII Spider Silk. It is also common to pad all areas of the rigging which might come in contact with abrasive surfaces. To ensure safety, most highliners wear a climbing harness or swami belt with a leash attached to the slackline itself. Leash-less, or "free-solo" slacklining – a term loosely taken from rockclimbing ("free" refers to free of aid equipment vs free from the slackline) – is not unheard of, however, with proponents such as Dean Potter and Andy Lewis.

Slackline yoga

Slackline yoga takes traditional yoga poses and moves them to the slackline. It has been described as "distilling the art of yogic concentration".  To balance on a  piece of webbing lightly tensioned between two trees is not easy, and doing yoga poses on it is even more challenging. The practice simultaneously develops focus, dynamic balance, power, breath, core integration, flexibility, and confidence. Using standing postures, sitting postures, arm balances, kneeling postures, inversions and unique vinyasa, a skilled slackline yogi is able to create a flowing yoga practice without ever falling from the line.

Slackline yoga has been covered in The Wall Street Journal, Yoga Journal and Climbing Magazine.

Rodeo lines

This type of very "slack" slackline provides a wide array of opportunities for both swinging and static maneuvers. A rodeo line has no tension in it, while both traditional slacklines and tightropes are tensioned. This slackness in the rope or webbing allows it to swing at large amplitudes and adds a different dynamic. This form of slacklining first came into popularity in 1999, through a group of students from Colby College in Waterville, Maine. It was first written about on a website called the "Vultures Peak Center for Freestyle and Rodeo Slackline Research" in 2004. The article "Old Revolution—New Recognition - 3-10-04" describes these early developments in detail.

History
While rope walking has been around in one manner or another for thousands of years, the origins of modern-day slacklining is generally attributed to a rock climber named Adam Grosowsky from southern Illinois in 1979 when he was sixteen. In 2012 a slackline performance by Andy Lewis was featured as part of the half time show by Madonna.  It got attention during the 2016 Rio Olympics when slackliner Giovanna Petrucci performed on the beach at Ipanema, attracting the attention of the New York Times.

A professional slackliner was credited with climbing a ski lift tower in Colorado and shimmying across a cable to save a man caught by a ski lift in January 2017.

Highlining history
Highlining was inspired by highwire artists. The first successful highline walk is credited to 20-year-old Scott Balcom and 17-year-old Chris Carpenter who performed the first documented walk on nylon webbing highline. On July 13, 1985, Scott Balcom successfully crossed the Lost Arrow Spire highline. In 1995, Darrin Carter performed unprotected crossings of the Lost Arrow Spire in Yosemite and The Fins, in Tucson, Arizona, on Mt. Lemmon highway. On July 16, 2007, Libby Sauter became the first woman to successfully cross the Lost Arrow Spire,. In 2008, Dean Potter became the first person to BASE jump from a highline at Hell Roaring Canyon in Utah.

World records

Longest highline
The record was set by four athletes between July 4 and July 6, 2021. All of them walked this line from beginning to end without falling, taking times from approximately 70–180 minutes.

Longest free solo highline
At a length of 110m and height of 200m, the longest free solo highline was walked at the Verdon Gorge in Southern France by German Slackliner Friedi Kühne. The longest free solo highline by a female is held by Faith Dickey, who walked a 28-meter-long highline in Ostrov, Czech Republic, in August 2012. The line was 25 meters high.

Highest slackline
The highest slackline on record was walked by Christian Schou on August 3, 2006, at Kjerag in Rogaland, Norway. The project was repeated by Aleksander Mork in September 2007.
Rafael Zugno Bridi currently holds the world record who walked a slackline between two hot air balloons.

The current world record for the highest urban highline is held by Friedi Kühne, Mia Noblet, Gennady Skripko, Vladimir Murzaev, Maksim Kagin, Alexander Gribanov, and Nathan Paulin. All seven athletes managed to walk a 220m-long, 350m-high slackline between Oko Tower and Neva Tower 2 in Moscow, on September 7, 2019.

Longest slackline (longline)
The previous record had been set in September 2014 by Laetitia Gonnon, who walked 230 m (754 ft 7.1 in) in Lausanne, Switzerland.

Longest blindfolded slackline walk 
On 28 April 2019 in Kislovodsk, Russia, Friedi Kühne and Lukas Irmler from Germany walked a 975m-long, 200m-high slackline entirely with their eyes closed, ensuring this with a blindfold strapped over their eyes. Thus they broke the world record for the longest blindfolded slackline walk.

See also

 Jultagi

References

External links

 International Slackline Association
 YogaSlackers

Circus skills
Individual sports
Tightrope walking